William Garfield Dumpson (February 12, 1930 – July 15, 2014) was a former player for the Negro leagues.

Dumpson was raised and attended school in Port Washington, NY. He was a member of the Indianapolis Clowns in 1950, Homestead Grays, Philadelphia Stars and the New York Black Yankees. Dumpson was also a member of the Harlem Globetrotters. He died in 2014 at the age of 84.

References

External links
 and Seamheads

African-American baseball players
African-American basketball players
Harlem Globetrotters players
Homestead Grays players
Indianapolis Clowns players
New York Black Yankees players
Philadelphia Stars players
2014 deaths
American men's basketball players
1930 births
20th-century African-American sportspeople
Baseball pitchers
21st-century African-American people